Tomosvaryella littoralis  is a species of fly in the family Pipunculidae. It is found in the Palearctic.

References

External links
Images representing  Tomosvaryella at BOLD

Pipunculidae
Insects described in 1897
Diptera of Europe
Taxa named by Theodor Becker